Emirau Airport is an airfield in Emirau Island, Papua New Guinea.

History

World War II

Emirau was seized unopposed by two Battalions of the 4th Marine Regiment on 20 March 1944. Naval Construction Battalions arrived shortly after the landings and began construction of two coral-surfaced  by  airfields on the island. Inshore Airfield had 35 double hardstands capable of parking 210 fighter or light-bomber planes, while North Cape Airfield had 42 hardstands with space for parking 84 heavy bombers. Both were fully equipped with towers, lighting, and a dispensary. The aviation tank farm consisted of three  tanks and nineteen  together with the appropriate filling and distribution points. Emirau was the staging point for attacks on the Japanese strongholds at Rabaul and Kavieng.

US Marine Corps units based here included:

VMSB-243 operating SBDs from June–December 1944
VMB-413 operating PBJs
VMB-433 operating PBJs
VMB-443 operating PBJs
VMB-611 operating PBJs

Royal New Zealand Air Force units based here included:
No. 1 Squadron operating PV-1s from May–June 1945
No. 3 Squadron operating PV-1s 
No. 4 Squadron operating PV-1s from November 1944-February 1945 and June–July 1945
No. 8 Squadron operating PV-1s from February–March 1945
No. 9 Squadron operating PV-1s from March–May 1945
No. 14 Squadron operating F4Us from July–August 1945
No. 19 Squadron operating F4Us from November 1944-January 1945
No. 22 Squadron operating F4Us from January–March 1945
No. 23 Squadron from March–May 1945
No. 25 Squadron operating F4Us from May–July 1945

There was also one Australian unit located on the island - the 474 Heavy Anti-aircraft Troop.

Base roll-up commenced in December 1944 and was completed by May 1945.

Postwar
The runways remain usable.

References

External links
 

Airports in Papua New Guinea
New Ireland Province